Longtou is a town of Potou District, Zhanjiang, in southwestern Guangdong province, China. , it has one residential community and 11 villages under its administration. It is served by China National Highway 325, which provides the town with direct access to downtown Zhanjiang.

See also 
 List of township-level divisions of Guangdong

References 

Township-level divisions of Guangdong